Kožljek is a village in the hills north of Begunje in the Municipality of Cerknica in the Inner Carniola region of Slovenia.

Church

The local church in the settlement is dedicated to Saint Anne and belongs to the Parish of Begunje pri Cerknici.

References

External links

Kožljek on Geopedia

Populated places in the Municipality of Cerknica